Hangzhou West railway station is a railway station located in Cangqian Subdistrict, Yuhang District, Hangzhou, Zhejiang Province, China. The station was opened on 22 September 2022.

It is served by Shangqiu–Hangzhou high-speed railway (Huzhou–Hangzhou section) and will be served by Hangzhou–Wenzhou high-speed railway.

Hangzhou West railway station is the third largest transport hub in Hangzhou after Hangzhou Xiaoshan International Airport and Hangzhou East railway station.

Construction 
Construction began on 17 September 2019. It is part of the infrastructure preparations for the 2022 Asian Games. The budget for the construction is 15 billion yuan ($2.25 billion). It was opened on 22 September 2022.

Transportation

Metro station
Hangzhou West railway station is served by Line 3 and Line 19 of the Hangzhou Metro. The metro station also opened on 22 September 2022.

References 

Railway stations in China opened in 2022
Railway stations in Zhejiang